The Association for Logic, Language and Information (FoLLI) each year awards the E. W. Beth Dissertation Prize, named in honor of the Dutch mathematician Evert Willem Beth, to outstanding PhD theses in the fields of Logic, Language, and Information. Dissertations are evaluated on the basis of their technical depth, strength and originality. Each year the award can be assigned ex aequo to more than one thesis, or to no thesis at all. The prize consists of a certificate, a monetary award, and an invitation to submit (a possibly revised version of) the thesis to the FoLLI Publications on Logic, Language and Information, published by Springer Science+Business Media.

List of previous winners

See also

 List of mathematics awards

References

External links 
 Association for Logic, Language and Information — FoLLI official home page

Language-related awards
Mathematics awards
Philosophy awards